Johnstown is a village in County Meath, Ireland. Located about 3 kilometres (2 mi) southeast of Navan, the village is 40 km (30 mi) northwest of the Dublin city centre. The village lies close to the N3 national primary road. The surrounding area is primarily agricultural.

It is the home of the Walterstown GAA football club, and Johnstown FC.

Amenities
The village of Johnstown is served by two schools, St Stephens National School and Coláiste na Mí. Between 2000 and 2008, development in the area transformed it from a tranquil country setting to a small growing commuter town. Amenities include Johnstown Shopping Centre, as well as Johnstown Park and IDA centre.

See also
 List of towns and villages in Ireland

External links
 Johnstown Community
 Johnstown FC
 The Johnstown Times

Navan